Most dialects of modern English have two close back vowels: the near-close near-back rounded vowel  found in words like foot, and the close back rounded vowel  (realized as central  in many dialects) found in words like goose. The  vowel , which historically was back, is often central  as well. This article discusses the history of these vowels in various dialects of English, focusing in particular on phonemic splits and mergers involving these sounds.

Historical development

The same four vowels existed in the Middle English system. Generally, the Middle English vowels descended from the corresponding Old English ones, but there were certain alternative developments: see Phonological history of Old English#Changes leading up to Middle and Modern English.

At some point, short  developed into a lax, near-close near-back rounded vowel, as found in words like put. (Similarly, short  has become .) According to Roger Lass, the laxing occurred in the 17th century, but other linguists have suggested that it may have taken place much earlier. The short  remaining in words like lot has also been lowered and, in some accents, unrounded (see open back vowels).

Other words that underwent shortening later consistently have , such as good, book, and wool. Still other words, such as roof, hoof, and root, are still in the process of the shift, with some speakers preferring  and others preferring  in such words, such as in Texan English. For some speakers in Northern England, words ending in -ook, such as book and cook still have the long  vowel.

– split

The split occurs in most varieties of English, the most notable exceptions being most of Northern England and the English Midlands and some varieties of Hiberno-English. In Welsh English, the split is also absent in parts of North Wales, under influence from Merseyside and Cheshire accents, and south Pembrokeshire, where English replaced Welsh long before it occurred in the rest of Wales.

The first clear description of the split dates from 1644.

The absence of the split is a less common feature of educated Northern English speech than the absence of the trap–bath split. The absence of the foot–strut split is sometimes stigmatized, and speakers of non-splitting accents may try to introduce it into their speech, which sometimes results in hypercorrection, such as by pronouncing butcher .

From a historical point of view, however, the name is inappropriate because the word foot did not have short  when the split happened, but it underwent shortening only later.

{| cellspacing="0" cellpadding="0"
|-
| style="width:9em"|
| style="width:3em" valign="center"|
| style="width:3em"|
| style="width:3em"|
| style="width:3em"|
| style="width:3em" |
|
|- style="text-align:center"
|
| moodgoosetooth
| goodfootbook
| bloodfloodbrother
| cutdullfun
| putfullsugar
|- style="text-align:center"
| Middle English
|style="border-top:1px solid;border-left:1px solid"| 
|style="border-top:1px solid"| 
|style="border-top:1px solid"| 
|style="border-top:1px solid;border-left:1px solid"| 
|style="border-top:1px solid"| 
|- style="text-align:center"
| Great Vowel Shift
|style="border-top:1px dotted;border-left:1px solid"| 
|style="border-top:1px dotted"| 
|style="border-top:1px dotted"| 
|style="border-left:1px solid"| 
| 
|- style="text-align:center"
| Early Shortening
|style="border-left:1px solid"| 
| 
|style="border-top:1px dotted;border-left:1px solid"| 
| 
| 
|- style="text-align:center"
| Quality adjustment
|style="border-left:1px solid"| 
| 
|style="border-top:1px dotted;border-left:1px solid"| 
|style="border-top:1px dotted"| 
|style="border-top:1px dotted"| 
|- style="text-align:center"
| Foot–strut split
|style="border-left:1px solid"| 
| 
|style="border-top:1px dotted;border-left:1px solid"| 
|style="border-top:1px dotted"| 
|style="border-left:1px solid"| 
|- style="text-align:center"
| Later shortening
|style="border-left:1px solid"| 
|style="border-top:1px dotted;border-left:1px solid"| 
|style="border-left:1px solid"| 
| 
|style="border-left:1px solid"| 
|- style="text-align:center"
| Quality adjustment
|style="border-left:1px solid"| 
|style="border-left:1px solid"| 
|style="border-top:1px dotted;border-left:1px solid"| 
|style="border-top:1px dotted"| 
|style="border-left:1px solid"| 
|- style="text-align:center"
| RP output
|style="border-left:1px solid"| 
|style="border-left:1px solid"| 
|style="border-left:1px solid"| 
| 
|style="border-left:1px solid"| 
|-
|+ 'Stages of the – split and beyond, as described by 
|}

In modern standard varieties of English, such as Received Pronunciation (RP) and General American (GA), the  vowel  is a fairly rare phoneme. It occurs most regularly in words in -ook (like book, cook, hook etc.). It is also spelt -oo- in foot, good, hood, room, soot, stood, wood, wool, and -oul- in could, should, would. Otherwise it is spelt -u- (but -o- after w-); such words include bull, bush, butcher, cushion, full, pudding, pull, push, put, sugar, wolf, woman.

–  merger 
The merger causes minimal pairs such as unorthodoxy  and an orthodoxy  to be merged. The phonetic quality of the merged vowel depends on the accent. For instance, merging General American accents have  as the stressed variant,   as the word-final  variant. That can cause words such as hubbub ( in RP) to have two different vowels even though both syllables contain the same phoneme in both merging and non-merging accents. On the other hand, in Birmingham, Swansea and Miami, at least the non-final variant of the merged vowel is consistently realized as mid-central , with no noticeable difference between the stressed and the unstressed allophones.

That largely matches an older canonical phonetic range of the IPA symbol , which used to be described as covering a vast central area from near-close  to near-open .

Because, in unmerged accents,  only appears in unstressed syllables, this merger occurs only in unstressed syllables. However, there is some dialectal variation, with varieties such as broad Cockney using variants that are strikingly more open than in other dialects. In contemporary Standard Southern British the final  is often mid , rather than open .

See hurry–furry merger for more information.

Some other minimal pairs apart from unorthodoxy–an orthodoxy include unequal  vs. an equal  as well as a large untidy room  vs. a large and tidy room . However, there are few minimal pairs like that, and their use as such has been criticized by scholars such as Geoff Lindsey because the members of such minimal pairs are structurally different. Even so, pairs of words belonging to the same lexical category, such as append  vs up-end  and aneath  vs uneath , exist as well.  There also are words for which RP always used  in the unstressed syllable, such as pick-up , goosebumps , or sawbuck , which merging accents use the same  as the second vowel of balance. In RP, there is a consistent difference in vowel height; the unstressed vowel in the first three words is a near-open  (traditionally written with ), but in balance, it is a mid .

Development of /juː/

In Early Modern English,  merged into  as well.

 has remained as such in some Welsh, some northern English and a few American accents. Thus, those varieties of Welsh English keep threw  distinct from through . In most accents, however, the falling diphthong  turned into a rising diphthong, which became the sequence . The change had taken place in London by the late 17th century. That has caused the standard pronunciations of duke  (or ), new , few  and rude .

– merger
The – merger is a phenomenon that helps define Scottish English, Northern Irish English, Malaysian English, and Singapore English, in which the modern English phonemes  and  have merged into a single phoneme. As a result, word pairs like look and Luke are homophones, plus good and food and foot and boot rhyme. 

The history of the merger dates back to two Middle English phonemes: the long vowel  (which shoot traces back to) and the short vowel  (which put traces back to). (See the table in the section "– split" above for more information about these early shifts.) The final step, however, was for certain English dialects under the influence of foreign languages (the Scots language influencing Scottish English, for example) to merge the newly united  vowel with the  vowel (of mood and shoot): the – merger. Again, this is not an internally motivated phonemic merger but the appliance of different languages' vowel systems to English lexical incidence. The quality of this final merged vowel is usually  in Scotland and Northern Ireland but  in Singapore. 

The full–fool merger is a conditioned merger of the same two vowels specifically before , which causes pairs like pull/pool and full/fool to be homophones; it appears in many other dialects of English and is particularly gaining attention in several American English varieties.

Other changes
In Geordie, the  vowel undergoes an allophonic split, with the monophthong  being used in morphologically-closed syllables (as in bruise ) and the diphthong  being used in morphologically-open syllables word-finally (as in brew ) but also word-internally at the end of a morpheme (as in brews'' ).

Most dialects of English turn  into a diphthong, and the monophthongal  is in free variation with the diphthongal , particularly word-internally. Word-finally, diphthongs are more usual.

Compare the identical development of the close front  vowel.

As a result, "ruin" is pronounced as monosyllabic  and "fluid" is pronounced .

See also
Phonological history of English
Phonological history of English vowels
Phonological history of English consonants
Phonological history of English consonant clusters#Yod-dropping

Notes

References

Bibliography

 
 
 
 
 

Splits and mergers in English phonology